Homer Wayne Summa (November 3, 1898 – January 29, 1966) was an American professional baseball right fielder. He played in Major League Baseball (MLB) from 1920 to 1930. He began his career with the Pittsburgh Pirates, but played most of his career for the Cleveland Indians before finishing as a reserve with the Philadelphia Athletics. His career batting average was .302. He is buried in Glendale, California's Grand View Memorial Park Cemetery.

On May 31, 1927, he became the first player in history to hit into a game ending unassisted triple play.

In 840 games over 10 seasons, Summa compiled a .302 batting average (905-for-3001) with 413 runs, 166 doubles, 34 triples, 18 home runs, 363 RBI, 166 base on balls,.346 on-base percentage and .398 slugging percentage. Defensively, he recorded a .960 fielding percentage.

References

External links

1898 births
1966 deaths
Baseball players from Missouri
Cleveland Indians players
Philadelphia Athletics players
Pittsburgh Pirates players
Major League Baseball right fielders
Mobile Bears players
Norfolk Mary Janes players
Birmingham Barons players
Rochester Colts players
Wichita Falls Spudders players
Portland Beavers players
Los Angeles Angels (minor league) players
Seattle Indians players
Burials at Grand View Memorial Park Cemetery